Lori Barth is an American songwriter who has written many popular songs, as well as a
recording artist, record producer, journalist, and the senior editor of The Score for The Society of Composers & Lyricists.

Early life
Lori Barth was born in Los Angeles, California and raised in the San Fernando Valley.  She studied music and wrote songs at a young age.  At age 16, she had a monthly column for Movie Teen Illustrated.  After graduating from California State University, Northridge with a degree in history and journalism, she became the Assistant Fashion Editor at California Apparel News.

Career
Barth switched careers, pursuing music full-time as a writer, performer and guitar teacher.  As the latter, she coached Barbra Streisand for A Star is Born, Amy Irving for Honeysuckle Rose, Christina Applegate, Beau Bridges, Allison Sudol, David Navarro from Red Hot Chili Peppers among others.  Barth had her own music school for over thirteen years with folk artist Bud Dashiell.

After closing the school, she became the editor for the quarterly journal of The Society of Composers and Lyricists called The Score. She earned two Deems Taylor awards for her work with The Score.  She also has served on the board of directors for The Society of Composers.

As a songwriter, Barth co-wrote the theme song to Joyeux Noël entitled "I'm Dreaming of Home" with composer Phillip Rhombi.  It has been performed at many international events including the 2008 Musique & Cinema Festival in Auxerre, France with a 100 voice choir.  It was also chosen for the 90th commemoration of the Canadian Battle of Battle of Vimy Ridge.

Hit Songs
Barth has several worldwide, platinum-selling songs including "Mi Cuerpo Pride Mas", "Arena Y Sol" sung by Mi Mundo, "Left of Center" sung by Dewi Pechler, and "I'm Dreaming of Home" the theme song to the film Joyeux Noel and "Gonna Get It Right" by Nikkole.

She has also written songs for Keb' Mo', A.J. Croce, Girlfriend, Sarah Geronimo, Mark Bautista and Claire de la Fuente, and contributing songs featured on the television show Brothers & Sisters, Smallville, and HBO and Lifetime Movies.

Discography

References

External links
http://www.loribarth.com/ 
http://www.ascap.com/playback/2005/spring/stepping_out.aspx

Record producers from California
Living people
Year of birth missing (living people)
American women songwriters
Songwriters from California
American women journalists
California State University, Northridge alumni
American women record producers
21st-century American women